Cryptaspasma anaphorana is a moth of the family Tortricidae first described by Lord Walsingham in 1914. It is found in Panama.

References

Moths described in 1914
Microcorsini